Herbert Ernest Russell (7 June 1899 – 9 April 1983) was an Australian rules footballer who played for the South Melbourne Football Club in the Victorian Football League (VFL).

Family
The son of Alfred Russell (1863-1947), and Mary Jane Russell (1866-1941), née Bray, Herbert Ernest Russell was born on 7 June 1899.

Notes

External links 

 VFA Project: Russell, H. 'Bert'.

1899 births
1983 deaths
Australian rules footballers from Melbourne
Sydney Swans players
Williamstown Football Club players
Port Melbourne Football Club players
People from Port Melbourne